Baghi Sipahi (Punjabi) is a 1986 Pakistani, action and musical film directed and produced by Fiaz Sheikh. The film, starring actors Sultan Rahi, Mumtaz, Mustafa Qureshi, Aasia and Afzaal Ahmed.

Cast 
 Sultan Rahi as (Sultan)
 Mumtaz as Bali
 Mustafa Qureshi as Sher Singh
 Aasia as Pareeto
 Talish
 Sawan
 Iqbal Hassan
 Allauddin
 Ilyas Kashmiri
 Afzaal Ahmed
 Diljeet Mirza
 Seema

Soundtrack
The music of Baghi Sipahi is composed by Master Abdullah with lyrics penned by Khawaja Pervez Aalam Bin Muslim, Mehmood Shahid.

References 

1980s war films
Pakistani action films
Pakistani fantasy films
1986 films
1986 action films
Punjabi-language Pakistani films
1980s Punjabi-language films